Joseph Ernest Oscar Gladu (October 25, 1870 – December 25, 1920) was a Canadian politician, who served in the House of Commons of Canada from 1904 to 1911, and from 1917 to 1920.

Born in Saint-François-du-Lac, Yamaska County, Quebec, the son of Victor Gladu and Mary Gill, Gladu was educated at St. Mary's Jesuit College in Montreal, Quebec. A notary by profession, he was first elected to the House of Commons of Canada for the electoral district of Yamaska in the general elections of 1904. A Liberal, he was re-elected in 1908 and was defeated in 1911. He was re-elected in 1917. He died in office in 1920.

References

External links
 
 The Canadian Parliament; biographical sketches and photo-engravures of the senators and members of the House of Commons of Canada. Being the tenth Parliament, elected November 3, 1904

1870 births
1920 deaths
Liberal Party of Canada MPs
Members of the House of Commons of Canada from Quebec